The Honda S-MX is a compact MPV produced by Honda, sold between 1996 and 2002.

Design 
The S-MX was based on the S-MX Concept model first exhibited at the 31st Tokyo Motor Show in 1995, and was similar in appearance to the larger Honda Stepwgn, shortened substantially in length and height. Whereas the Stepwgn had three rows of seating to accommodate eight passengers the smaller S-MX has two rows of seating for four or five passengers. In order to maximize space for passengers the S-MX uses a front bench seat and a column shifter for the four-speed automatic transmission (the only available transmission).

The S-MX was powered by a 2.0 L version of Honda's B-series engine featuring double overhead camshafts and four valves per cylinder; it did not use Honda's VTEC system. This engine was shared with the Honda CR-V and Honda Stepwgn. Similar to the CR-V and Stepwgn, the S-MX was available with front-wheel-drive or optional four-wheel-drive.

As was customary of minivans of the time the S-MX features only one (conventional) rear door on the passenger (left) side of the vehicle. Ostensibly this feature was for the safety of passengers, to prevent them from stepping out into traffic. All chassis codes start with RH1 for the Base model and Lowdown (Lowdown is also printed on the chassis plate). All 4WD models have chassis codes starting with RH2.

Overview 
The S-MX went on sale on November 22, 1996, as the fourth product of 'Creative Mover' series, which were Honda's automobiles with the aim of 'Lifestyle Enhancing Vehicles' that expand the users' lifestyles with more fun and richness.

The vehicle was available in three different trims:
 Base trim with front-wheel-drive
 4WD, which featured four-wheel-drive, a 15 mm higher ride height and added gear selections for the transmission
 Lowdown, which featured a 15 mm lower ride height compared to the base model, a front chin spoiler, a rear spoiler, side skirts and unique 3-spoke 15-inch wheels

Colors available: White, Black, Orange, Silver, Tahitian Green, Blue

Optional Extras 
 Sunroof
 Rear Spoiler (Lowdown only)
 ABS Braking system
 Orange Interior Seats, Speaker Grills, Air-Vents, Door Handles (Lowdown only)
 Clear Indicators
 Wind Deflectors
 Floor Mats
 Rear Headrests
 Chrome Door Mirror Covers
 Remote Central Locking
 Mudflaps
 Parking Assistance Pole
 Front Fog Lights
 Electric Folding Mirrors
 Rear Tinted Windows
 Wood Effect Dashboard

Facelift 
The S-MX was slightly restyled in September 1999. Another minor change took place in December the following year. The late 2000 change also introduced a new trim, Custom Basic with a front bench seat. This new trim was lower-priced and eliminated several of the once-standard features such as a CD player, electric mirrors and tinted rear windows for privacy. Improvements were made to the styling with re-modeled headlights and front bumper. 

Colors available: White, Black, Silver, Blue, Purple, Red, Green, Grey

Changes in 1999 
 Body colored bumpers
 Overdrive Gearbox
 Improved B20 Engine (140 PS)
 Black plastic interior panels
 Orange Lowdown upgrades now replaced with red.
 4 and 5 seater option on Lowdown and 4WD models

Optional Extras 
 Blue seat coverings (Base/4WD)
 Grey with red dots, Grey Hatched Seat coverings (Lowdown)
 Satellite Navigation
 Electric Folding Mirrors
 Remote Central Locking
 Rear Tinted Windows
 Sunroof
 Roof Spoiler
 Climate Control
 Fog Lights
 Armrest (5 Seater Only)
 3 Spoke Steering Wheel
 Red Carpet (Lowdown)
 Wood Effect Dashboard
 Exhaust Trim

Special Editions 
Two special editions were introduced:

Aero Style - This included: More aggressive front lip, rear lip, spoiler and side skirts. larger alloy wheels, silver dashboard trim and leather interior.

Casual Style - This included: Wooden effect dashboard, black seats, different alloy wheels

End of production 
Production of the S-MX ended in 2002, and the vehicle was replaced by the Honda Mobilio Spike in 2002. Many used examples were exported to other countries, with the UK, Australia, New Zealand and Canada being the most popular destinations.

References 

SMX
Cars introduced in 1996 
2000s cars